Miklós Hofer (8 May 1931 – 10 January 2011) was a Hungarian architect.

Hofer was born in Bozsok, Hungary.  He undertook his undergraduate studies at the Budapest Technical University in 1954 and gained a master's degree in 1958. He worked for the Department of Public Works from 1955 and became a teacher at the university in 1973. He became president of the Hungarian Society of Architects in 1964, taking part in the planning of numerous towns and cities. He retired in 2001.  Hofer died in Budapest on 10 January 2011.

Main works

 Kazincbarcika, main square (1952)
 Miskolc, Avasi lookout and TV tower (1960)
 Gyöngyös, school (1959)
 Budapest, plan for National Theatre, 2nd prize (1966–1967)
 Szentendre, library and cultural centre (1968–1970)
 Győr, Transport college (1974)
 Budapest V., Roosevelt Square office building (demolished)
 Budapest, Water department head office (1969)
 Szentendre, Barcsay museum (1974)
 Szentmártonkáta, school (1983)

Prizes
 Miklós Ybl Prize (1964)
 Pro Urbe Prize
 Széchenyi Prize (1998)

References 

  
Source: translated from Hungarian Wikipedia

External links
 Biography 
 Biography in Szentendrei Lexikon 

Architects from Budapest
1931 births
2011 deaths
Danube-Swabian people
Hungarian people of German descent
People from Vas County